Hindoo (1878–1901) was an outstanding American Thoroughbred race horse who won 30 of his 35 starts, including the Kentucky Derby, the Travers Stakes, and the Clark Handicap. He later sired Preakness Stakes winner Buddhist and Belmont Stakes winner and Leading sire in North America Hanover.

He was a bay colt bred by Daniel Swigert of Elmendorf Farm in Kentucky. Hindoo was sired by Virgil (sire of the Kentucky Derby winners, Vagrant and Ben Ali). His dam, Florence, was by the great racehorse and sire Lexington. He was a brother to Florida, who was the dam of the very good racemare Firenze, who won 47 of her 82 starts.

Racing record
He was trained by future Hall of Fame inductee Edward D. Brown. Hindoo was sold for $15,000 during his two-year-old season to the Dwyer Brothers Stable of Mike and Phil Dwyer, and his training was taken over by another future Hall of Fame inductee, James G. Rowe, Sr.

1881 Kentucky Derby
Hindoo was a 3-1 favorite heading into Kentucky Derby. Ridden by Jim McLaughlin, when the race started, Hindoo, as expected, took the lead. Then, at the halfway pole, Lexex took the lead. As the horses went into the turn, Hindoo regained the lead, and when he entered the stretch he was in command and won by four lengths going away.

After the Derby
On September 1, 1881, Hindoo won his 19th consecutive race in a purse event at Sheepshead Bay Race Track. His winning streak ended six days later when he finished third in the September Handicap at Sheepshead.

Hindoo also won: Colt and Filly Stakes, Alexander Stakes, Tennessee Stakes, Juvenile Stakes, Jockey Club Stakes, Criterion Stakes, Tremont Hotel Stakes, Blue Ribbon Stakes, Clark Stakes, Tidal Stakes, Coney Island Stakes, Ocean Stakes, Lorillard Stakes, Monmouth Sweepstakes, Travers Stakes, Sequel Stakes, United States Hotel Stakes, Kenner Stakes, Louisville Cup, Merchants' Stakes, Turf Handicap, Coney Island Handicap, Coney Island Cup, Champion Stakes, Jersey Stakes, and St. Leger Stakes.

He placed second in the Day Boat Line Stakes, Brighton Beach Cap, and Dixiana Stakes. Hindoo finished third in the Windsor Hotel Stakes and the September Cup.

In thirty five starts, Hindoo was never out of the money. He won thirty times, was second three times, and was third twice. As a three-year-old, he won the 1881 Kentucky Derby in a season where he recorded eighteen straight wins over the course of a few months— nineteen if a dead-heat run-off on the same day is counted.  Over the course of his racing career, he won $71,875, making him America's leading money earner. In 1881, he was America's Champion Three-Year-Old Male.

At stud
In his first season at stud, Hindoo's mating with Bourbon Belle produced the champion Hanover, who became the leading sire in the United States for four consecutive years.

Hindoo sired the following top racehorses:
 Hanover
 Buddhist, the 1889 Preakness Stakes winner 
 Jim Gore, won the 1887 Clark Handicap and was second in the 1887 Kentucky Derby
 Sallie McLelland (1888), a good race-mare who later produced the Kentucky Oaks winner Audience

Hindoo is the damsire of the following racehorses:
 Whimsical, the 1906 Preakness Stakes winner 
 Helios, 1912 American Champion Two-Year-Old Colt
 Blue Girl, the 1901 & 1902 American Champion filly

Hindoo died on July 4, 1901, at Runnymede Stud in Paris, Kentucky.  Following the creation of the National Museum of Racing and Hall of Fame in 1955, he was one of the first handful of horses inducted.

Pedigree

Sire line tree

Hindoo
Merry Monarch
Hanover
Buck Massie
Jake
Buckleya
Halma
Alan-a-Dale
Barnsdale
Smart Set
Acacia
Oversight
Mirebeau
Insight
Hammon
Handsome
The Commoner
Simon D.
Johnnie Blake
Doctor Boots
Countless
Parmer
Great Britain
Ben Holladay
Handspring
Major Daingerfield
Handout
Trouble
Heywood
Palo Alto
Hamburg
Inflexible
Textile
Pluvious
Strephon
Dandelion
Battleaxe
Burgomaster
Bourgeois
Burgoright
Glasgow
Sebastolbol
Portugal
Orison
The Irishman
Baby Wolf
Hillside
Borrow
Buskin
Prince Eugene
Happy Go Lucky
Handball
Handsel
Grover Hughes
Colonel Livingstone
Sanders
Half Time
Handcuff
David Garrick
Star of Hanover
Withers
Admonition
Holstein
Abe Frank
Black Stock
Mentor
Wise Counsellor
Kaffir
Kaffir Boy
King Hanover
Prince Ahmed
Luck and Charity
Serpent
Yankee
Dinna Ken
Yankee Gun
Joe Madden
Marse Abe
Marse Hughes
Naushon
Nonpareil
Penobscot
Jim Gore
Beau Gallant
Gorman
Merry Lark
Buddhist
Hindoocraft
Dungarvan
J. H. Houghton
Aryan
Macy
Benroe
Howland
Miller
Alard Scheck

See also
List of leading Thoroughbred racehorses

References

 Hall of Fame page, with images
 America's Champion Three-Year-Old Males

1878 racehorse births
1901 racehorse deaths
American Champion racehorses
Racehorses bred in Kentucky
Racehorses trained in the United States
United States Thoroughbred Racing Hall of Fame inductees
Kentucky Derby winners
Thoroughbred family 24
Byerley Turk sire line